Galverpeton is an extinct genus of prehistoric salamander. It lived during the Barremian-Aptian stages in the Early Cretaceous, in what is now Western Europe. The type species, Galverpeton ibericum, was described by Estes and Sanchíz in 1982. It was found in the Castellar Formation, part of the Galve fossil assemblage. The fossil is in the Institut Paleontologic Miquel Crusafont, Sabadell.

It is related to Apricosiren, Bishara, Hylaeobatrachus, Marmorerpeton, and Ramonellus.

See also
 Prehistoric amphibian
 List of prehistoric amphibians

References

Prehistoric salamanders